Zarini is an Italian or Iranian (Persian) surname, and may refer to: 

 Alexandra Zarini (1985), a children's rights activist, an heiress of the Gucci family;
 Hamzeh Zarini (1985), an Iranian volleyball player;
 Hussain Zarrini (1930), an Iranian weightlifter.

See also 
 Zarina